John McArthur (born 20 October 1964) is an Australian former professional rugby league footballer who played in the 1980s and 1990s.

Playing career
McArthur started his first grade career at Western Suburbs in 1984 which was a tough year for the club on the field where they only claimed one victory in the entire season and finished last on the table.  

After another difficult year with Wests in 1985, McArthur joined North Sydney where he spent the following nine seasons before retiring at the end of the 1995.  McArthur played in two finals campaigns for Norths in 1986 and in 1991 where the club went to within one game of the grand final but were defeated by Canberra in the preliminary final.

References

1964 births
Living people
Australian rugby league players
North Sydney Bears players
Rugby league halfbacks
Rugby league centres
Rugby league fullbacks
Rugby league players from Sydney
Western Suburbs Magpies players